Zuleikha Opens Her Eyes is a Russian television historical fiction drama series based on the novel Zuleikha by Guzel Yakhina and aired on channel Russia-1 in April 2020. The series stars Chulpan Khamatova as Zuleikha Valieva, a peasant woman from the Tatar village in the Soviet Union.

Plot 
It's the story of a peasant woman Zuleikha from the small Tatar village. In 1930 there is the Soviet campaign of political repressions of kulaks. Zuleikha's husband resisted dekulakization and was killed by communists. Zuleikha was transported to Siberia and left in a remote location on Angara River with little means of survival. She had to overcome the harsh conditions, build relationships with other exiles and forge her new identity and reasons for living.

Cast and characters 
 Chulpan Khamatova as Zuleikha
 Evgeny Morozov as Ivan Ignatov
 Yulia Peresild as Nastasya
 Roman Madyanov as Zinovy Kuznec
 Sergey Makovetskiy as Wolf Karlovich Leibe
 Aleksandr Bashirov as Vasily Gorelov
 Aleksandr Sirin as Konstantin Arnoldovich
 Elena Shevchenko as Isabella
 Dmitriy Kulichkov as Ikonnikov
 Roza Khayrullina as Zuleikha's mother-in-law

Production 
Zuleikha Opens Her Eyes is a screen version of the best-selling novel by Guzel Yakhina. The book won the Yasnaya Polyana Literary Award and the Big Book Award in 2015.

The filming of the TV series was first announced in March 2016 and began on September 11, 2018. The main part of the entire series was filmed in Tatarstan. On the bank of the Kama River in the city of Laishevo, the historical settlement of Semruk was built. Part of the filming took place in the ethnographic complex Tatar Avyly in the village of Isakovo, Zelenodolsky District of Tatarstan.

Reception

Critical reception 

The series received mixed reviews from viewers, critics and public figures.

On 15 April 2020 the chairman of the political party Communists of Russia Maxim Suraykin said the film desecrated the memory of the Soviet past and announced the preparation of an official appeal to the leadership of the TV channel Russia-1 to stop the show of the series on the air.

On 17 April 2020 the head of the Spiritual assembly of muslims of Russia Albir Krganov sent the letters to the chairman of VGTRK Oleg Dobrodeev and the head of FADN Igor Barinov to clarificate contents of the second series with a sex scene in a mosque and the use of the names of prominent Muslim figures among the exiles.

Awards and nominations

References

2020s Russian television series
Historical television series
Russian drama television series
Works about the Gulag
Russia-1 original programming